Miyuki Takahashi (born 7 October 1993) is a Japanese professional footballer who plays as a forward for WE League club Omiya Ardija Ventus.

Club career 
Takahashi made her WE League debut on 12 September 2021.

References 

Association football people from Fukuoka Prefecture
WE League players
Living people
1993 births
Japanese women's footballers
Women's association football forwards
Omiya Ardija Ventus players